Derk Droze (born October 29, 1972) is an American former professional soccer player, who is currently coaching in Denmark for the Danish Club FC Nordsjælland. During his playing career, he played professionally in Chile, Denmark and the United States.

Droze, grew up in the Southern Maryland area, 30 miles outside Washington DC in the small town of La Plata, graduating from St. Mary's Ryken High School in 1990. In February 1996, the New England Revolution selected Droze in the fifteenth round (145th overall) of the 1996 MLS Inaugural Player Draft. In the fall of 2001, he moved to Ølstykke FC of the Danish First Division. He played sixty games, scoring twenty-one goals with Ølstykke. In 2002, he moved to Helsingør IF.
 
In June 2003, Droze was cast to be a part of the movie The Game of Their Lives.

DOXA finished as the second best men's amateur team in the US in 2011 losing in the Final on PK's to the Pancyprian Freedom from Eastern New York.

References

External links
 Droze ready for American dream return

1972 births
Living people
American men's futsal players
American soccer players
American expatriate soccer players
Sportspeople from Fairfax, Virginia
Soccer players from Virginia
Hollywood United players
Lyngby Boldklub players
Ølstykke FC players
New Orleans Riverboat Gamblers players
Association football forwards